Clark Pearce was a college football player. He was a tackle for coach Wallace Wade's Alabama Crimson Tide. Pearce blocked a punt against Stanford in the Rose Bowl. Against Mississippi A&M in 1927, Pearce stripped the quarterback and returned the fumble 80 yards for a touchdown.

References

All-Southern college football players
American football tackles
Alabama Crimson Tide football players
Players of American football from Alabama